This is a list of Lenoir-Rhyne Bears football players in the NFL Draft.

Key

Selections

References

Lenoir-Rhyne

Lenoir-Rhyne Bears NFL Draft